"Holding On" is a 1988 single by Steve Winwood from the album Roll with It. The song was written by Winwood along with Will Jennings. "Holding On" was the last of four number ones for Winwood on the Adult Contemporary chart. The single went to number one for two weeks and peaked at number 11 on the Billboard Hot 100.

Music video
The music video (directed by David Fincher) opens with an unidentified photographer taking out camera equipment. The rest of the video is shown in motion, with flashes indicating candid snapshots of various people from different walks of life: people walking on the street, patrons of a diner, women in formal dress, a dinner suggesting an underworld boss and his girlfriend (although they pose for the camera, others cover their faces or move to leave the table), a soldier just home from the war (presumed to be World War II) embracing his son, and an elderly couple in high spirits on a park bench.

Interspersed with these images are occasional scenes of Winwood playing solitaire in his room, then going out for a walk, having his shoes shined, having coffee at a diner, then finally returning to his room and lying on his bed as the sun shines through his window.

Charts

Year-end charts

Credits 
 Steve Winwood – lead vocals, keyboards, Hammond organ, Fairlight programming, guitar
 Robbie Kilgore – additional keyboards
 Mike Lawler – additional keyboards
 John Robinson – drums
 Bashiri Johnson – percussion
 The Memphis Horns
 Wayne Jackson – trombone and trumpet
 Andrew Love – tenor saxophone 
 Tessa Niles – backing vocals
 Mark Williamson – backing vocals

References

1988 singles
Steve Winwood songs
Music videos directed by David Fincher
Songs written by Steve Winwood
Songs with lyrics by Will Jennings
1988 songs
Song recordings produced by Russ Titelman
Virgin Records singles